"Mermaid's Avenue" is a song written by American folk singer Woody Guthrie.  In 1943, Guthrie moved his family to 3520 Mermaid Avenue, Coney Island, New York.  The song is named after this  street. There, Guthrie was an active participant in the thriving cultural and political scene of Brooklyn's Jewish community.  The song's title later served as the project title for the Wilco and Billy Bragg album Mermaid Avenue; a cover version by the New York-based klezmer band The Klezmatics is included on their 2006 album Wonder Wheel.

The lyrics describe Guthrie's vision of America in microcosm.  All sorts of unlikely comings and goings transpire, with meetings between unlikely characters.  The scene, although fervent, is not always pretty, leading him to wonder in the song's refrain, "Why they call it Mermaid Avenue, that’s more than I can see."

Recordings

References
Ed Cray, Ramblin' Man: The Life and Times of Woody Guthrie, W.W. Norton.

External links
 "Mermaid's Avenue" lyrics
 

Woody Guthrie songs
Songs written by Woody Guthrie